Veronica elliptica, synonym Hebe elliptica, is a plant of the family Plantaginaceae. It is native to New Zealand (including the Antipodean Islands and the Chatham Islands), south Argentina, south Chile and the Falkland Islands. It is an evergreen, bushy shrub of 1 m or more in height, with green, oval leaves, 2–4 cm long. Flowers are white to pale mauve.

References

 
 Hebe Society entry
 Rhodora 23:39. 1921.
 Allan, H. H. B. et al. 1961–. Flora of New Zealand.
 Encke, F. et al. 1984. Zander: Handwörterbuch der Pflanzennamen, 13. Auflage.
 Marticorena, C. & M. Quezada. 1985. Catalogo de la flora vascular de Chile.
 Moore, D. M. 1983. Flora of Tierra del Fuego.
 Zuloaga, F. O. & O. Morrone, eds. 1996. Catálogo de las plantas vasculares de la República Argentina. I. Pteridophyta, Gymnospermae y Angiospermae (Monocotyledonae), II. Dicotyledonae. Monogr. Syst. Bot. Missouri Bot. Gard. 60, 74., 1999.

elliptica
Flora of Argentina
Flora of Chile
Flora of the Falkland Islands
Flora of New Zealand